Aksum University (AKU) is a teaching university in Aksum in Tigray Region, Ethiopia. It offers teaching programs and research projects which lead toward undergraduate and master's degrees. It was established in February 2007 with the objective of teaching about education, research and community service. During the Tigray War in late 2020 and early 2021, the university's facilities were "completely destroyed", according to Alula Habteab, head of the Bureau of Construction, Road and Transport in the Transitional Government of Tigray.

International Relationships
 - University of Graz, University of Vienna
 - Metropolitan State College of Denver, University of Nebraska, Lincoln

References

External links

Educational institutions established in 2007
Tigray Region
Universities and colleges in Ethiopia
2007 establishments in Ethiopia